Anderssen is a surname, and may refer to:

Adolf Anderssen (1818–79), German chess grandmaster, unofficial first world champion from 1851–58, 1860-1865 and 1867–68
Anderssen's Opening, chess opening named after Adolf Anderssen
Justus Anderssen (1867–1938), Norwegian physician and philatelist
Lena Anderssen (born 1974), Faroese-Canadian singer-songwriter
Sigmund Alfred Anderssen (b. 1961), Norwegian professor
Torgeir Anderssen-Rysst (1888–1958), Norwegian politician and Minister of Defense

See also
 Andersen
 Anderson (disambiguation)

Patronymic surnames